Lex Dwyer is a former Australian rules footballer, who played for the Fitzroy Football Club in the Victorian Football League (VFL).

Lex Dwyer transferred to VFA club Prahran for the 1978 season and kicked a goal in their historic Grand Final win over Preston in the same year.

References

External links

Fitzroy Football Club players
1956 births
Living people
Australian rules footballers from Victoria (Australia)